Roccella Valdemone (Sicilian: Rascidda Vaddemuni) is a comune (municipality) in the Metropolitan City of Messina in the Italian region Sicily, located about  east of Palermo and about  southwest of Messina.

Roccella Valdemone borders the following municipalities: Castiglione di Sicilia, Malvagna, Mojo Alcantara, Montalbano Elicona, Randazzo, Santa Domenica Vittoria.

References

Cities and towns in Sicily